The High Negotiations Committee (HNC) is an umbrella body which was created to represent the Syrian opposition in the planned Geneva peace talks in 2016. It is led by Riyad Farid Hijab, who was Prime Minister of Syria from June to August 2012. It is considered to be Syria's main or broadest opposition bloc.

History 

The HNC was founded in December 2015 at a conference held in Riyadh, Saudi Arabia, which was attended by around 100 delegates. At the end of the conference, a joint statement was issued to confirm the formation of "a High Negotiations Committee for the Syrian Revolution and Opposition Forces (HNC), with its headquarters in Riyadh, to undertake the tasks of choosing a negotiating delegation and to act reference point for negotiators with the representatives of the Syrian regime on behalf of the participants".

The group's chief negotiator, Mohammed Alloush, a member of Jaish al-Islam, resigned from the HNC in May 2016 because of the lack of progress in the Syrian peace process.

In September 2016, the HNC set out a detailed transition plan for Syria, committing the country to democratic and religious pluralism. The 25-page document was launched in London and was welcomed by the United Kingdom's government.

In January 2017, the HNC announced that it will support the Syrian peace talks in Astana, which began on 23 January.

In February 2017, the HNC chief coordinator Riyad Farid Hijab rejected a statement by Staffan de Mistura that the latter will select delegates for the Syrian opposition in Geneva. He also objected to the participation Democratic Union Party (PYD) in the Geneva conference.

The HNC, led by Naser al-Hariri, participated in the Geneva peace talks on Syria (2017).

Criticism 

The HNC has faced criticism from Russia because it includes groups like Ahrar al-Sham and Jaysh al-Islam. Its transition plan in September 2016 was also criticized by the opposition Kurdish National Council and the Assyrian Democratic Organization due to it not addressing minority ethnic groups in Syria. The Kurdish National Council withdrew from the HNC on 29 March 2017 in protest to the latter's opposition to federalism and human rights for Kurds in Syria.

Composition
As of December 2015, the HNC included 33 committee members from the following political and military opposition organizations:
9 members of National Coalition of Syrian Revolution and Opposition Forces
Kurdish National Council (2015-2017)
5 members of National Coordination Committee for Democratic Change
9 independent oppositional figures:
Louai Hussein, who heads the Building the Syrian State Movement
Ahmad Jarba, a former National Coalition president
11 members of militant rebel factions:
Free Syrian Army
Southern Front
2nd Coastal Division
Mount Turkmen Battalion
Mountain Hawks Brigade
Ahrar al-Sham
Jaysh al-Islam
Ajnad al-Sham Islamic Union

See also

 Syrian Democratic Forces

References

Organizations established in 2015
Organizations of the Syrian civil war
Political opposition organizations
Political party alliances in Syria
Politics of Syria
Syrian opposition
Syrian peace process